The Ground Beneath My Feet is a 2019 Austrian drama film directed by Marie Kreutzer. It was selected to compete for the Golden Bear at the 69th Berlin International Film Festival.

The Ground Beneath My Feet had its world premiere at the Berlin International Film Festival on 9 February 2019. It premiered in Austria at the Diagonale film festival on 19 March 2019. The film was released theatrically on 22 March 2019. It was released in Germany on 16 May 2019. The Ground Beneath My Feet screened at the Inside Out film festival in Toronto on 26 May 2019; and the Frameline Film Festival in San Francisco on 21 June 2019.

Plot
Lola is due to travel to Germany for work when she finds her sister Conny has tried to commit suicide. Lola is in a relationship with her boss Elise. Lola tries to continue working for an important client but one of her colleagues is trying to undermine her. She hides that she has returned to Austria with her sister in crisis. She begins to doubt her own sanity, thinking she is hallucinating. Eventually, Conny is discharged and goes to live at Lola's flat. Lola is stunned that her colleague has been promoted and given another project in Australia. Lola returns home to find that Conny has committed suicide. Lola has a breakdown.

Cast

 Valerie Pachner as Lola Wegenstein
 Pia Hierzegger as Conny Wegenstein
 Mavie Hörbiger as Elise
 Michelle Barthel as Birgit
 Marc Benjamin as Sebastian Selikowski
 Axel Sichrovsky as Herr Bacher
 Dominic Marcus Singer as Jürgen
 Meo Wulf as Clemens

References

External links
 
  Der Boden unter den Füßen at Film Institut 
  Der Boden unter den Füßen at Edition Salzgeber 
  The Ground Beneath My Feet at Strand Releasing
 

2019 films
2019 drama films
2019 LGBT-related films
Austrian drama films
2010s German-language films
Lesbian-related films
German LGBT-related films
LGBT-related drama films
Austrian LGBT-related films
2010s German films